Earnest Herman Magnuson (October 9, 1894 – July 15, 1955) was an American politician from New York.

Life
He was born on October 9, 1894, in Halmstad, Sweden. The family emigrated to the United States in 1901, and settled in Wilcox, Pennsylvania. In 1907, they removed to Jamestown, Chautauqua County, New York. He engaged in the insurance business and entered politics as a Republican.

Magnuson was a member of the New York State Assembly from 1941 until his death in 1955, sitting in the 163rd, 164th, 165th, 166th, 167th, 168th, 169th and 170th New York State Legislatures.

He died suddenly on July 15, 1955, while on vacation in Visby, Gotland, Sweden; and was buried at the Lake View Cemetery in Jamestown.

Sources

1894 births
1955 deaths
Politicians from Jamestown, New York
Republican Party members of the New York State Assembly
Politicians from Halmstad
Swedish emigrants to the United States
20th-century American politicians